Amor fati is a Latin expression meaning 'love of fate', and refers to seeing everything that happens, including suffering and loss, as good or necessary.

Amor Fati may also refer to:

Music
 Amor Fati (Peccatum album), 2000
 Amor Fati, an album by Sarasara, 2016
 Amor Fati, an album by Guerilla Poubelle, 2013
 Amor Fati, an album by Mich Gerber that featured Imogen Heap
 Amor fati, album by Bertrand Cantat, 2017
 "Amor Fati", a 1996 song by Gary Lachman
 "Amor Fati", a song by Washed Out from the 2011 album Within and Without
 "Amor Fati", a song by Epik High from the 2014 album Shoebox
 "Amor Fati", a song from the soundtrack of Ms. Hammurabi
 "Amor Fati", a song from the film Blood & Chocolate
 "Amor fati", the theme song of South Korean TV show Miss Trot
 "Amor fati", an orchestral music composition by Giorgos Koumendakis, 2007

Other uses
 Amor Fati (film), a short film featuring Predrag Bjelac
 Amor Fati (TV series), a 2021 South Korean TV series
 "The Sixth Extinction II: Amor Fati", an episode of The X-Files
 Amor fati, a 1946 collection of essays on life in Bergen-Belsen by Abel Herzberg
 Amor Fati #1, a 2013 art work by Shane Guffogg
 Amor Fati, a 2003 art work by Michael Warren (sculptor)